Vinsobres is an Appellation d'Origine Contrôlée (AOC) for red wine in the southern part of the Rhône wine region of France, situated around Vinsobres.

Vinsobres was previously a part of the Côtes-du-Rhône Villages AOC. On 17 February 2006, it was created as a separate AOC, and therefore received the status of a "Rhône Cru". The wines must contain at least 50% Grenache and 25% Syrah and/or Mourvèdre.

Historically, this area has a strong tradition in olive cultivation, and some current vineyards have been converted from growing olives.

External links

 The Committee of Winegrowers of Vinsobres

References

Rhône wine AOCs